Malaya Tovra is a rural locality (a settlement) in Matigorskoye Rural Settlement of Kholmogorsky District, Arkhangelsk Oblast, Russia. The population was 138 as of 2010.

Geography 
Malaya Tovra is located 22 km south of Kholmogory (the district's administrative centre) by road. Bolshaya Tovra is the nearest rural locality.

References 

Rural localities in Kholmogorsky District